Ancylolomia planicosta is a moth in the family Crambidae. It was described by E. L. Martin in 1956. It is found in Ethiopia, Kenya, Rwanda and South Africa.

References

Ancylolomia
Moths described in 1956
Moths of Africa